The Canadian Journal of Occupational Therapy (French title: Revue canadienne d'ergothérapie) is a peer-reviewed academic journal that covers the field of occupational therapy. The editor-in-chief is Catherine Vallée (Université Laval). It was established in 1933 and is published by SAGE Publications.

Abstracting and indexing 
The journal is abstracted and indexed in:

According to the Journal Citation Reports, its 2016 impact factor is 1.255, ranking it 39 out of 65 journals in the category "Rehabilitation".

References

External links 
 

SAGE Publishing academic journals
Multilingual journals
Publications established in 1933
Occupational therapy journals
5 times per year journals